is a form of traditional and folkloric Japanese songs.

Overview
The actual form of jinku songs probably appeared in the Edo period. Jinku is a vocal performance using verses. These songs often depicts qualities of character, love stories, worklife, or comedic situations.

Like the dodoitsu genre, jinku uses lyrics constituted by one chorus of 7, 7, 7, 5. Each song can be divided in 6 parts.: 
Utamakura (まくら唄), an often repeated descriptive epithet
Honuta (本唄), the main body of the song
Hayashi (はやし), the accompaniment of meaningless words in the song for rhythm
Honuta (本唄), the resumption of the main body of the song
Maeuta (前唄), the prelude to the song's end
Atouta (後唄), the encore

Tsugarujinku
 is a folkloric song often performed with a variety of instruments, such as shamisen, Japanese flute (Shakuhachi) or Japanese drums (Taiko). It birthed in the Aomori prefecture, either in Tsugaru or Hirosaki, and is commonly used to accompany a traditional dance bearing the same name. The genre is also called "Dodarebachi" from the first words of most songs.

Sumo jinku

 is one of the most popular and known form of jinku. The yobidashi are traditionally given the task of composing jinku even though it is now quite common to have wrestlers composing it. It is often distributed in three sub genres: meisho  jinku (名所甚句), glorifying songs; o iwai jinku (お祝甚句), festive songs; and owarai jinku (お笑い甚句), comedic songs.

Sumojinku follows a precise sequence in which the singer occupy the center of the dohyo and sing with an open fan while wrestlers circles him and punctuate the song with hands gestures and explamations like "hoi" and "dosukoi" while moving around the singer. Every rikishi, no matter his rank, can participate to a jinku song, even those in the lower ranks. However, only  gets to wear their .

Some wrestlers are well known for their ability to sing traditional jinku such as Ikioi, Daishi or Konishiki.

Japan Sumo Jinku Association
The  is a body that gave itself the mission promote, teach and develop jinku songs, and more specifically sumo jinku songs, as an art and culture in Japan under the jurisdiction of the Agency for Cultural Affairs. The organization has its headquarter in Ryōgoku, Sumida Tokyo.

History
The association was founded in 1995 by former Nishonoseki yobidashi Nagao (real name: Fukuda Nagamasa, 1930–2012) who notably composed the jinku for the retirement ceremony of yokozuna Wakanohana in 1963, or the "Sumo Training Song" (相撲協会錬成歌) in 1979. In 2012, his daughter, Iida Michiyo, became the chairman of the association.

Missions
The association tends to develop a strong territorial network by founding and approving local branches divided in 6 regional zones:
Northern region (Kitahiroshima, Aomori, Tsugaru, Yamagata, Kurihara, Sōma) 
Eastern region (Mito, Kashima, Takasaki, Saitama, Edogawa, Tokyo, Katsushika, Tokyo, Nakano, Tokyo, Ōta, Tokyo, Sumida, Tokyo, Oedo, Kanagawa, Chiba)
Hokushinetsu region (Saku, Jōetsu, Kanazawa, Tsuruga)
Tokai region (Shizuoka, Gotemba, Toyohashi)
Western region (Osaka, Naniwa, Kobe, Tanba, Tokushima, Hōfu)
Kyushu region (Higashi-ku, Fukuoka, Hakata, Fukuoka, Saga Prefecture, Kumamoto, Kagoshima)

The association also maintain the teaching of the tradition in the country by appointing teachers ranked as instructor (師範), district master (地区総師範) or national general instructor (全国総師範) and by organizing nationwide tournaments.

Makouta
 is a worksong originating from the Iwate Province. It is originally the song of bakuro horse trainers. It was sung as the bakuro rode at night, to overcome boredom and loneliness, to let people know where the horse rider was and also to prevent rabbits and foxes from jumping out of the grass along the road to startle the horses.

Kisarazujinku
 is a genre of jinku song originating from Kisarazu. It was sung by fishermen at sea or during seine fishing

References 

Japanese styles of music
Japanese folk music